Golnar is a feminine given name of Persian origins. 

People with this name include:
 Golnar Abivardi (born 1973), Swiss dentist and entrepreneur
 Golnar Adili (born 1976), Iranian-born American multidisciplinary artist
 Golnar Khosrowshahi (born 1971), Iranian-born Canadian businesswoman and CEO
 Golnar Servatian (born 1977), Iranian cartoonist

Persian feminine given names